Valley Cottage is a hamlet and census-designated place in the town of Clarkstown, New York, United States. It is located northeast of West Nyack, northwest of Central Nyack east of Bardonia, south of Congers, northwest of Nyack, and west of Upper Nyack. The population was 9,107 at the 2010 census.

Geography
Valley Cottage is located at  (41.117862, −73.942531).

Demographics

At the census of 2000, there were 9,269 people, 3,347 households, and 2,379 families residing in the CDP. The population density was 2,168.7 per square mile (838.1/km2). There were 3,410 housing units at an average density of 797.9/sq mi (308.3/km2). The racial makeup of the CDP was 82.16% white, 3.59% African American, .09% Native American, 9.81% Asian, .13% Pacific Islander, 1.89% from other races, and 2.34% from two or more races. Hispanic or Latino of any race were 6.71% of the population.

There were 3,347 households, out of which 30.4% had children under the age of 18 living with them, 60.3% were married couples living together, 8.0% had a female householder with no husband present, and 28.9% were non-families. Of all households, 23.8% were made up of individuals, and 6.6% had someone living alone who was 65 years of age or older. The average household size was 2.66 and the average family size was 3.2.

In the CDP, the age distribution of the population shows 20.9% under the age of 18, 6.5% from 18 to 24, 29.0% from 25 to 44, 28.8% from 45 to 64, and 14.7% who were 65 years of age or older. The median age was 41 years. For every 100 females, there were 91.7 males. For every 100 females age 18 and over, there were 87.5 males.

The median income for a household in the CDP was $75,828, and the median income for a family was $87,123. Males had a median income of $51,718 versus $41,653 for females. The per capita income for the CDP was $33,181. About 1.4% of families and 2.7% of the population were below the poverty line, including 2.5% of those under age 18 and 1.7% of those age 65 or over.

History

The first known resident of Valley Cottage was John Ryder, who owned a large farm which comprised all or most of the area's school district.

The post office was first opened at the Valley Cottage Station in 1892.

According to George H. Burke's book Rockland County during the American Revolution, 1776–1781, Valley Cottage was once known as "Storm's Corner".  In 1876, just before the opening of the West Shore Railroad station, the residents assembled at the school room agreed on the name "Valley Cottage", referring to the house nearest the station "that cottage in the valley".  Another version has it that the name of the hamlet came about because of a famous trotting horse named "Cottage Maid", owned by Ed Green who owned the land where the station, the Marcus store and other buildings stood.

Awards and recognition

Education

 Valley Cottage is apart of Nyack Union Free School District
 Valley Cottage Elementary School
 Liberty Elementary School is a Blue Ribbon Award winner (2000–2001) and semi-finalists (2004), New York State winner of International Reading Award and ING Unsung Heroes Award (2004) for Karne Andreasen's "Turn on to Reading" program.
 Nyack Middle School
 Nyack High School

Community
Valley Cottage has a very close community with many schools, libraries, restaurants, and recreational opportunities. Valley Cottage has a calm and quaint atmosphere that is very welcoming. Valley Cottage also full of nature and is very accessible with many sidewalks. People within the community are known to be very kind and hospitable.

Libraries
There are many libraries in and surrounding Valley Cottage.
A few of them are:
Valley Cottage Library
Nyack Library - Located in Nyack,NY
West Nyack Library- Located in West Nyack,NY

Restaurants
There are various areas available to eat depending on what you are looking for. For Italian restaurants there is, Dee Marias Pizzeria- 482 Kings Highway and Valley Pizza- 4 Lakeridge Drive. If you are looking for Deli's, visit Valley Cottage Deli. Finally, if you are interested in Desserts, go to Kups and Kones- 491 Kings Highway.

Grocery Stores
Foodtown of Valley Cottage- 14 Lake Ridge Plaza
Shoprite of West Nyack- 243 NY-59

Parks and Recreation
Twin Ponds Park- Massachusetts Avenue, 54 Sedge Rd
Rockland Lake State Park- 299 Rockland Lake Rd
Valley Cottage Hamlet Green- New Lake Rd
Kings Park- 54, 34 Kings Hwy
Wholeness Center- 7 New Lake Rd

Transportation

Valley Cottage's major thoroughfares are New York State Route 303, U.S. Route 9W, and Kings Highway.

Valley Cottage is located along CSX Transportation's River Line, with between 20 and 55 freight trains passing through the hamlet daily. Passenger service on the line ended in 1959. The nearest railroad stations to Valley Cottage with current passenger service are Nanuet  5.2 miles away and Tarrytown 10 miles away.

Commuter transportation to New York City is provided by Rockland Coaches Route 9A to the George Washington Bridge Bus Terminal and Route 9T to the Port Authority Bus Terminal from the bus shelters at the intersection of Lake Road and New York State Route 303. The shelters are a 0.4 mile walk from the hamlet's Park and Ride facility. Local bus transportation is operated by Transport of Rockland's Route 91 & 97  and Clarkstown Mini-Trans Route A.

Tourism

Historical markers
Markers at Rockland Lake and Hook Mountain were unveiled on October 4, 2008.

Landmarks and places of interest
 The Josephine Hudson House belonged to the first woman to work in the Knickerbocker Ice Company.
 The Knickerbocker Ice Company was established in 1831. Rockland Lake was known to have had the cleanest and purest ice in the area. Knickerbocker's Ice House No. 3, located at Rockland Lake, could store more than 40,000 tons of ice harvested from the lake. The wooden storehouse's walls were insulated with sawdust to keep the ice blocks frozen until they were shipped in the summer. By 1834, the company owned a dozen steamboats and 75 ice barges, and employed about 3,000 to ship ice countrywide. The stored ice was placed on inclined railroad cars, transported down the mountainside, placed on barges on the Hudson River and shipped to New York City. So much ice was shipped that Rockland Lake became known as the "Icehouse of New York City". Knickerbocker burned down in 1926. Knickerbocker's Ice House No. 3 is currently a Clarkstown town historic site. Wells Fargo Home Mortgage recently pledged to help preserve the remaining walls. Only those walls and some scattered foundations from other icehouses remain. The Hanchar family who has deep roots in the hamlet, recently donated money for new markers at this site.
 Knickerbocker Fire House - established 1862
 Palisades Center bordering Valley Cottage from West Nyack side.
 Rockland Lake Community was a thriving community made up of the many workers at the Knickerbocker Ice Company.
 Rockland Lake State Park
 Storms Tavern - believed to have been built in 1765 restored in 2008
 Tolstoy Foundation of Valley Cottage, founded in 1939 by Alexandra Lvovna Tolstoy, youngest daughter of Leo Tolstoy. Some of the Board members throughout the years included Sergei Rachmaninoff - composer & conductor, Igor Sikorsky - aviation pioneer in both helicopters and fixed-wing aircraft, Boris Bakhmeteff - engineer, professor of Civil Engineering at Columbia University and the only ambassador of the Russian Provisional Government to the United States, Boris Sergievsky - one of the most colourful of the early aviators.

Religious institutions
 All Saints Church.
 All Saints Episcopal - consecrated in 1922.
 Elim Tabernacle Church
 Lake Avenue Chapel - torn down, abandoned cemetery.
 Islamic Center of Rockland.
 Methodist Church - which was located in Rockland Lake, torn down.
 St. Mary's Indian Orthodox Church.
 St. Michael's Church - Consecrated in 1901 and closed down in 1965 and torn down, however the Gethsemane Cemetery is still used.
 St. Therese's Chapel - consecrated in 1927 and was located on Church Lane, closed down in 1965 and torn down.
 Saint Paul's School.
 Saint Sergius of Radonezh Russian Orthodox Church - consecrated in 1940.

Notable people from Valley Cottage
 Isaac Bonewits, was an influential American druid who published a number of books on the subject of neopaganism.
 Stephen Greene, artist, along with his wife Sigrid de Lima, a novelist.
 Rose Thompson Hovick, lived on Ridge Rd. She was the mother of two famous performing daughters: the burlesque artist Gypsy Rose Lee and the actress June Havoc.
 Jack Klugman, actor, stated in the Rockland County Journal newspaper, that he lived on Kings Highway in Valley Cottage.
 Audrey Landers, actress, grew up on Sherry Drive, a scenic view from the top of the mountain.
 Judy Landers, actress, along with her sister grew up on Sherry Drive.
 Robert Maclay, president of the Knickerbocker Ice Company, late 1800s - early 1900s.
 Megan Leavey, Marine corporal who served in Iraq as a Military Police K9 handler. 
 Mitch Miller, musician, singer, conductor, record producer, record company executive.
 Princess Vera Constantinovna of Russia, the youngest child of Grand Duke Constantine Constantinovich of Russia and his wife Grand Duchess Elizabeth Mavrikievna.
 Vladimir Nikolayevich Petrov, professor at Yale and an academic, POW.
 Ismael Quintana (June 3, 1937 – April 16, 2016) was a Puerto Rican singer and composer of so-called salsa music.
 Claudio Sanchez, of the well-known band Coheed & Cambria, uses Valley Cottage for much of his side project, The Prize Fighter Inferno. Sanchez is originally from nearby Nyack.
 Nina Selivanova, author, lecturer and translator, lived on Storms Road.
 Anita Shreve, writer, novelist and editor, lived in the 1980s.
 Olga Spessivtseva, ballerina, one of the outstanding classical ballerinas of the 20th century.
 Kim Stanley, actress, primarily in television and theatre, in later years a teacher.
 William Styron, writer, lived for a year while writing his acclaimed first novel Lie Down in Darkness.
 Harvey Swados, novelist and writer, wrote his first published novel, Out Went the Candle.
 Alexandra Tolstaya, daughter of the Russian author Leo Tolstoy, was a resident of the town in later life, organized the Tolstoy Foundation Center, of which President Herbert Hoover was the First Honorary Chairman during the years 1939–1964. Aleksandr Solzhenitsyn spent many of his first few summer months after emigrating to United States here.
 Kristi Zea, production designer, costume designer, producer.

References

 Budke, George H. Rockland County during the American Revolution, 1776–1781. New York. The Rockland County Public Librarians Association. 1976

External links

 Valley Cottage Fire Department
 Tolstoy Foundation Inc
 Valley Cottage Elementary School
 Liberty Elementary School
 Valley Cottage Library

Census-designated places in New York (state)
Census-designated places in Rockland County, New York
Hamlets in New York (state)
Hamlets in Rockland County, New York